Arbenit Xhemajli (born 23 April 1998) is a professional footballer who plays as a centre-back for Liechtenstein club Vaduz. Born in Switzerland, he represents Kosovo at international level.

Club career

Neuchâtel Xamax
On 3 July 2017, Xhemajli joined Swiss Challenge League side Neuchâtel Xamax. On 12 August 2017, he made his debut in a 0–21 away deep win in the 2017–18 Swiss Cup first round against Montfaucon after being named in the starting line-up.

Sunderland
On 4 September 2020, Xhemajli signed a two-year contract with EFL League One club Sunderland. Four days later, he made his debut in 2020–21 EFL Trophy group stage against Aston Villa U21 after being named in the starting line-up. On 15 October 2020, it was announced that Xhemajli would be ruled out for the rest of the 2020–21 season after sustaining a knee injury on international duty.

Vaduz
On 5 August 2022, Xhemajli signed a two-year contract with Swiss Challenge League club Vaduz. Nine days later, he made his debut in a 2–4 home defeat against Thun after being named in the starting line-up.

International career

Youth
At the start of April 2013, Xhemajli received a call-up from Albania U15 for a selection camp in Switzerland. On 14 March 2018, Xhemajli received a call-up from Kosovo U21 for the 2019 UEFA European Under-21 Championship qualification matches against Azerbaijan U21 and Germany U21. His debut with Kosovo U21 came eight days later in a 2019 UEFA European Under-21 Championship qualification against Azerbaijan U21 after coming on as a substitute at 81st minute in place of the injured Besfort Kolgeci.

Senior
On 23 May 2018, Xhemajli received a call-up from Kosovo for the friendly match against Albania, he was an unused substitute in that match. His debut with Kosovo came on 10 October 2019 in a friendly match against Gibraltar after being named in the starting line-up.

Career statistics

Club

International

Honours
Sunderland
EFL League One play-offs: 2022

References

External links

1998 births
Living people
People from Brugg
Sportspeople from Aargau
Kosovan footballers
Kosovo under-21 international footballers
Kosovo international footballers
Kosovan expatriate footballers
Kosovan expatriate sportspeople in England
Kosovan expatriate sportspeople in Liechtenstein
Swiss men's footballers
Swiss expatriate footballers
Swiss expatriate sportspeople in England
Swiss expatriate sportspeople in Liechtenstein
Swiss people of Kosovan descent
Swiss people of Albanian descent
Association football central defenders
Swiss Challenge League players
FC Vaduz players
Expatriate footballers in Liechtenstein
Swiss Super League players
Neuchâtel Xamax FCS players
English Football League players
Sunderland A.F.C. players